Derek McGill (born 14 October 1975) is a Scottish former footballer who played as a forward. He enjoyed a five-year professional career in Scotland with Falkirk, Hamilton Academical, Raith Rovers, and Queen's Park; and also briefly played for English club Port Vale.

Career
McGill started his career with Falkirk in 1993, but after three years he moved on to Hamilton Academical. Four goals for the Second Division club justified a move into the Premier Division with Raith Rovers in 1996. He was forced to move home five times after giving evidence as a prosecution witness at the High Court in Airdrie and was sentenced to 100 hours community service after being caught with a machete he was using as protection. He made eight appearances in the 1996–97 season. Rovers were relegated and the next season McGill was used more frequently in the First Division. He bagged a brace on his return to Douglas Park, as Academicals had achieved promotion the previous season.

In September 1998, McGill completed his Scottish Football League set by dropping into the Third Division with Queen's Park. The next month he moved south to England, signing for Port Vale in the First Division on a free transfer. He made three substitute appearances away from Vale Park before returning to the Scottish First Division in December 1998 with old club Hamilton. However, he was released before the year was out.

Career statistics

Notes
Statistics pre-Raith Rovers are unavailable.

References

1975 births
Living people
Footballers from South Lanarkshire
Sportspeople from Lanark
Scottish footballers
Association football forwards
Falkirk F.C. players
Hamilton Academical F.C. players
Raith Rovers F.C. players
Queen's Park F.C. players
Port Vale F.C. players
English Football League players
Scottish Football League players